United is the debut studio album by French indie pop band Phoenix, released in 2000. Singles released from the album include "Too Young", "If I Ever Feel Better" and "Party Time".

Commercial performance
According to Virgin France, as of April 2004, the album has shipped 150,000 units worldwide.

Track listing

US/iTunes bonus track

Personnel
Phoenix
Laurent Brancowitz
Christian Mazzalai
Deck d'Arcy
Thomas Mars Jr.

Additional musicians

Rob – clavinet ("School's Rules", "Too Young", "If I Ever Feel Better", "Embuscade")
Cubain – percussion ("Too Young", "Honeymoon", "On Fire", "Embuscade")
Sandrine Longuet – harp ("Honeymoon")
Jean-Philippe Dary – clavinet ("On Fire")
Julia and Oliza – backing vocals ("On Fire")
Camille Baz Baz – Hammond organ ("On Fire")
Hugo Ferran – saxophone ("On Fire", "Embuscade", "Definitive Breaks"), string and horn arrangement ("Embuscade", "Summer Days")
Andrew Crocker – trumpet ("On Fire", "Embuscade")
Thomas Bangalter – Yamaha CS-60 synthesizer ("Embuscade")
Paddy Sherlock – trombone ("Embuscade")
P. Nadal – strings conductor ("Embuscade", "Summer Days")

Marlon - drums ("Summer Days", "Funky Squaredance Part One")
Eddie Efira – pedal steel ("Summer Days", "Funky Squaredance Part One")
Bryce de la Menardière – Epinette ("Funky Squaredance Part One")
The Love Choral Society – screams ("Funky Squaredance Part Two")
Morgan – Hammond organ and Wurlitzer ("Funky Squaredance Part Two")
Pedro Winter – Rapman synthesizer ("Funky Squaredance Part Two")
Noe Efira – lead guitar ("Funky Squaredance Part Three")
The Arcysian Vocal Ensemble – vocals ("Funky Squaredance Part Three")
The Hector Berliz Choir – vocals ("Funky Squaredance Part Three")
Jean-Claude Soubeyrand – conductor ("Funky Squaredance Part Three)
Junior Carrera – guitar ("Definitive Breaks")

Production and design
Phoenix – production, mixing ("Definitive Breaks")
Stephane Briat aka Alf – production, recording, mixing ("Embuscade")
Alex Firla – production, recording
Philippe Zdar – mixing (all tracks except "Embuscade", "Party Time", and "Definitive Breaks")
Jean-Paul Gonnod – mixing ("Too Young")
Julian Delfaud – mixing ("Party Time", "Definitive Breaks")
Mike March – mastering
Alexandre Courtès – cover design
Félix Lahrer – cover photograph

Charts

References

2000 debut albums
Astralwerks albums
Virgin Records albums
Phoenix (band) albums